Empis sericans is a species of fly in the family Empididae. It is included in the subgenus Euempis. It is found in the Palearctic.

References

Empis
Asilomorph flies of Europe
Insects described in 1833